Gorton High School (GHS or G-High) is a public high school for grades 9–12, in Yonkers, New York, operated by the Yonkers Public Schools.

History
The school was erected on its present site in 1923. It is Yonkers' oldest high school campus. Eighty-six classes have graduated from the Shonnard Place campus. The school has two gymnasiums, a cafeteria, a two-level auditorium, a garage, a computer science lab, a medical lab, and a courtroom. The campus is completed with a full-sized track, an athletic field, and a stadium that houses athletic events. The Commercial Horticulture Academy has  landscaped a Gorton "G" into the school's front lawn.

Gorton High School was named after Charles Eugene Gorton, Yonkers' second Schools Superintendent.

Campus
The school is located on a geographically contiguous city block in North-West Yonkers. It occupies a campus enclosed by Shonnard Place to the North, Park Avenue to the East, Palisade Avenue to the West and Convent Place to the South. As of 2011, the school  has an enrollment of approximately 1,155 students from grades 9 to 12, and over 100 faculty members.

Curriculum
Gorton is home to the Academy of Information Technology, the Law and Public Service Academy, the Medical and Health Professionals Academy, and the Commercial Horticulture Academy. Each academy has a partnership or affiliation with a number of outside organizations and businesses. The academies have been instrumental in assisting career minded Gorton graduates to achieve their career goals.

Newspaper article
During the year 2011 an article titled 'Regions Aging Schools Crumble as Finances Falter' by Cathey O'Donnell and Gary Stern, was featured in the local newspaper, The Journal News, which is well known throughout the Lower Hudson Valley of Westchester County, New York. The article was about several old school buildings within the region that were in a current state of disrepair, how much it would cost to fix them, and which if any might need to be demolished. One of the schools mentioned in the article was Gorton E. High School. Some interior pictures of the school were also featured in the article.

Notable alumni

Joel Steinberg (born 1941), attorney convicted of manslaughter

References

External links
Regions Aging Schools Crumble as Finances Falter

Public high schools in Yonkers, New York
1923 establishments in New York (state)
Educational institutions established in 1923